Inkcap may refer to any of a number of toadstools of the genera Coprinus, Coprinellus and Coprinopsis.

The best known, and very good to eat:
Coprinus comatus, the shaggy inkcap, lawyer's wig, or shaggy mane.

The next best known, and also conditionally edible:
Coprinopsis atramentaria, the common inkcap, inky cap, or tippler's bane. Edible, but causes effects similar to those of disulfiram. As such, alcohol is to be avoided before, during or after consumption.

Also any of the following, many of which are poisonous:
genus Coprinus:
C. alopecius, the distinguished inkcap
C. sterquilinus, the midden inkcap
genus Coprinellus:
C. disseminatus, the fairy inkcap, fairies' bonnets, or trooping crumble cap
C. domesticus, the firerug inkcap
C. micaceus, the glistening inkcap, mica cap, or shiny cap
genus Coprinopsis:
 
C. acuminata, the humpback inkcap
C. ammophilae, the dune inkcap
C. episcopalis, the mitre inkcap
C. jonesii, the bonfire inkcap
C. lagopus, the hare's foot inkcap or harefoot mushroom
C. nivea, the snowy inkcap
C. picacea, the magpie inkcap or magpie fungus
C. scobicola, the sawdust inkcap
C. stangliana, the pied inkcap

References